The Blue Springs R-IV School District is a school district that serves Blue Springs, Missouri in the Kansas City metropolitan area. The district has an enrollment of over 14,500 students.  The mission statement of the Blue Springs R-IV School District is to create an educational community in which each individual acquires knowledge, develops skills, and functions as a literate citizen to achieve personal goals. The Department of Elementary and Secondary Education reported that Blue Springs School District once again received a perfect score on the Annual Performance Report in 2011. This is the eleventh year in a row that the district has received a perfect score. This is determined by a number of factors including student achievement. The Blue Springs School District is one of only seven school districts in this state to have eleven consecutive years of distinction.

The district also serves a small southwestern portion of Independence, small northern portion of Lee's Summit, all of Lake Tapawingo and parts of unincorporated Jackson County, Missouri.

History

The community of Blue Springs was founded in 1845 near today's Burris Old Mill Park on Woods Chapel Road and Walnut Street.  The town quickly discovered a need for a schoolhouse. The district was founded in 1845. Blue Springs town built its first wood-frame one-room school on Woods Chapel Road during this period. This schoolhouse was razed in 1884 and a new wood-frame one-room school was built at the same location. 

In 1879 the railroad built a train depot one mile east of the original community of Blue Springs next to the new railroad tracks. The town moved to its present location to take advantage of the commerce the train depot would provide. The city of Blue Springs was incorporated as a city in 1880. The City of Blue Springs continued to grow as the old town declined as businesses and families moved to the new Blue Springs.  The town children continued to attend the old schoolhouse in what became known as "Old Blue Springs" for some time. 

In 1905 Blue Springs built its first two-story brick schoolhouse for the growing community. This school was built at 16th and Summit Streets. By this time, the old one-room schoolhouse on Woods Chapel Road in "Old Blue Springs" was still being used but was now considered a rural or separate school district rather than part of the Blue Springs "city" public schools.   

The first brick schoolhouse was razed in 1924 after the 1923 opening of a larger new two-story brick schoolhouse. This brick school house was built adjacent to the old brick school house. This new school was simply called the Blue Springs School. All students of the Blue Springs School District attended first through twelfth grades at this school until 1951. The last graduating class from this school was the class of 1955. The school remained in use by the district until the 1990s and was later renamed Hansel Lowe School.  It was eventually no longer used by the district and was sold to Timothy Lutheran Church.  Timothy Lutheran Church used it as a school until they also built a new school. Today the school building is used as a private residence.  

A practice of consolidating smaller school districts to eliminate one room school houses to better serve students was being completed across the state of Missouri.  This happened in Blue Springs in 1949. That year an election was held and 10 one room school houses or smaller school districts joined Blue Springs 'city' Public School District to become the Reorganized Blue Springs Missouri R-IV School District. The schools consolidated were as follows: Pleasant Grove, Eureka, Sunny Vale, Williams, Fairview, Old Blue Springs, Sunny Side, Delta, Baird and Moreland.

The population growth of the City of Blue Springs increased the need for space for students. In 1951, Thomas Ulitcan Elementary School opened as the first designated elementary school in the district. In 1955 the current freshman center on Vesper St. was completed as Blue Springs High School. This was the district's first high school.  The first graduating class of the new high school was the class of 1956. Franklin Smith Elementary School named for the founder of Blue Springs, opened its doors in 1967, as the second Elementary School in the district. The current Blue Springs High School opened its doors to students in 1971.

Since that time the district has continued to have rapid growth and has grown to have 13 elementary schools, 4 middle schools, 1 freshman center, 2 high schools, 1 alternative high school and a special education center.

Schools
Elementary
Chapel Lakes Elementary School
Cordill-Mason Elementary School
Daniel Young Elementary School
Franklin Smith Elementary School
James Lewis Elementary School
James Walker Elementary School
John Nowlin Elementary School
Lucy Franklin Elementary School
Sunny Pointe Elementary School
Thomas Ultican Elementary School
Voy Spears Elementary School
William Bryant Elementary School
William Yates Elementary School

Middle Schools
Brittany Hill Middle School
Delta Woods Middle School
Moreland Ridge Middle School
Paul Kinder Middle School (formerly Sunny Vale)
High Schools
 Blue Springs Freshman Campus
 Blue Springs High School
 Blue Springs South High School
 Valley View High School

The Blue Springs School District also offers "Liggett Trail Education Center" which is a setting designed to address the needs of students from age 3 to 21 years with Special Needs or Disabilities. It is mainly an Early Childhood Special Education Center for 3- to 5-year-olds. Emphasis is upon school/parent communication, developmentally appropriate practices, specialized therapies and team approach that allows each student to work toward his or her potential.

Notable alumni

 Colby Velaer, 4 year varsity all-state track and field athlete, FBLA all-state competitor, National History Day all-state competitor
 Andrew Smith, NSDA national finalist with Tsarevitch Ivan, the Firebird and the Gray Wolf
 Brandon Lloyd, former professional wide receiver for the New England Patriots of the NFL 
 Ladell Betts, former professional running back for the Washington Redskins of the NFL 
 Jon Sundvold, NBA player and All-American college basketball player at the University of Missouri
 David Cook, 7th-season winner of American Idol
Donald Stephenson, former professional offensive linemen for the Kansas City Chiefs and Denver Broncos 
Steve Harris, former professional basketball player in the NBA 
Darius Hill, former professional football player in the NFL
Elijah Lee, professional linebacker for the Cleveland Browns 
Deiondre' Hall, professional cornerback for the Chicago Bears 
Darrius Sheperd, professional wide receiver for the Green Bay Packers, Kansas City Chiefs
Nick Tepesch, professional baseball player in the MLB 
Lonnie Palelei, former professional offensive linemen in the NFL and XFL 
Kris Johnson, professional baseball player formerly in the MLB
Connor Harris, former professional linebacker for the New York Jets, Arizona Cardinals, Cincinnati Bengals 
Khalil Davis, professional Defensive Lineman for the Pittsburgh Steelers 
Carlos Davis, professional Defensive Lineman for the Pittsburgh Steelers

References

External links
 Blue Springs School District
Blue Springs Freshman Center
Blue Springs High School
Blue Springs South High School

School districts in Missouri
Education in Jackson County, Missouri
Independence, Missouri
School districts established in 1845